York Preparatory Academy is a public charter school authorized by the South Carolina Public Charter School District. Opened in 2010, York Preparatory Academy serves many students in York County, South Carolina from grades K-12 with some students from other nearby counties. York Preparatory Academy  is located in Rock Hill, South Carolina in a suburban-rural transition area.  In February 2014, York Preparatory Academy became the first public charter school in South Carolina to issue a non-profit bond through private investments, allowing the school to take ownership of the 42-acre campus, which has four large buildings, sports fields, and parking.  The $30 million bond came to fruition in part due to the strong enrollment profile of the school.  

The current enrollment at the school is approximately 1500 students in grades K-12.  York Preparatory Academy is one of the largest brick-and mortar public charter schools in the Carolinas.

Administration

Mr. Richard Shepard currently serves as the High School Principal with Ryan Bridges and Jennifer McGugan serving as Middle School and Elementary Principals, respectively.

Charter schools in South Carolina
Buildings and structures in Rock Hill, South Carolina
Schools in York County, South Carolina
Public middle schools in South Carolina
Public elementary schools in South Carolina